Townie – A Memoir is a 2011 memoir by American novelist and short story writer Andre Dubus III.  It details Dubus' childhood in Haverhill, Massachusetts and his frequently turbulent relationship with his father Andre Dubus II.

Summary 
Dubus writes about growing up in Haverhill, Massachusetts in the 1970s after his parents divorced.  Dubus and his three siblings spent much of their time alone while their mother worked to support the family. Dubus describes his years as a boxer, how it saved his life, and led him to writing.

Characters 
The main characters are his family and friends. He grew up with three siblings.

Reception 

2011 non-fiction books
American memoirs
Haverhill, Massachusetts
W. W. Norton & Company books